Sonagiri or Swarnagiri about 60 km from Gwalior, has scores of Jain temples dating from the 9th century onwards. It is located in the Datia district of Madhya Pradesh, India. This location is popular among devotees and ascetic saints to practice self-discipline, and austerity and to attain Moksha (salvation or liberation). This place also has a Jain museum.

Etymology
In Hindi, Sonagiri means a mountain ('giri') of gold ('sona').

Approach 
Sonagiri can be accessed via Dabra-Datia Road. This also lies on Gwalior-Jhansi Road. Sonagiri Railway Station lies on the Agra-Jhansi rail line.

Jain tradition 

Sonagiri, a Siddha-Kṣetra, is considered one of the most important Jain Tirtha (pilgrimage site).

According to Jain texts, since the time of Chandraprabhu (the 8th Teerthankar), five and a half crores of ascetic saints have achieved moksha (liberation) here. The place is considered sacred by devotees. There is a  rock cut image of Chandraprabhu dating back to the 5th to 6th century. There are a total of 103 temples with 77 on hill and 26 in village. The Samavsharan of Bhagwan Chandraprabhu came here seventeen times. According to Jain belief, King Nanganang along with half a million followers attained moksha. Nang, Anang, Chintagati, Poornachand, Ashoksen, Shridatta, Swarnbhadra and many other saints achieved salvation here.

This is a unique place known as Laghu Sammed Shikhar covering the area of 132 acres of two hills. 
Sonagiri was also had a Bhattaraka seat and following the death of Bhaṭṭāraka Candrabhūṣaṇa the seat became defunct in the late twentieth century. A number of Bhattarakapada-sthāpnā manuscripts were also composed here.

Architecture 
There are total of 77 temples on the hill. Each temple are white in colour and features a high spire. The temple number 57 is the main temple in Sonagiri. Acharya Shubh Chandra and Bhartrihari lived and worked here for spiritual achievements. Like Kundalpur, Girnar Jain temples, Dilwara temples and Shikharji, the Sonagiri temple complex is known for its rich architecture.

Main Temple and Idol

The temple Number 57 is the main temple. This is vast in size and possesses an attractive artistic spire. In this temple, the principal deity is a  idol of Chandraprabha popularly known as Bade baba. There are two vedis (altar) with an idol of Sheetalnath and Parsvanatha on either side on the main vedi. The temple also includes a  manastambha and a model of Samavasarana.

The Samavasarana temple enshrines a beautiful sculptural representation of Samavasarana. The sculpture features moulding at the base supported by three circular tiers surmounted by a square pavilion and enshrines a chaumukha (four-faced) image of a Jina at the centre.

The temple is popular among Jain devotees and was also visited by former US president Bill Clinton and European presidents.

Fair 
A ratha yatra is organised here after Holi from Chaitra Pratipada to Rang Panchami. An annual 'flag hoisting' ceremony is also organised, on this occasion the old flag of the spire is replaced with a new golden coloured flag.

Gallery

See also 
 Muktagiri
 Gopachal Hill

References

Citation

Sources

Books

Web

External links 
 
 Columbia University in the city of New York - Sonagiri

Jain temples in Madhya Pradesh
9th-century Jain temples
Datia district